Guy is a hamlet in northern Alberta, Canada within the Municipal District of Smoky River No. 130. It is the home of Honey Bunny honey products.

Demographics 
Guy recorded a population of 57 in the 1991 Census of Population conducted by Statistics Canada.

See also 
List of communities in Alberta
List of hamlets in Alberta

References 

Hamlets in Alberta
Municipal District of Smoky River No. 130